During the 2000–01 season, Dundee participated in the Scottish Premier League.

Season summary
Dundee appointed Italian Ivano Bonetti as player-manager, and the midfielder managed to attract a variety of international players, most notably Argentinian World Cup star Claudio Caniggia. Dundee won the first two matches of the season to lead the table, but were unable to sustain the good form and finished the season in sixth, with the undistinguished record of only four home wins all season. Nonetheless, the club did provide supporters with memories to savour, such as wins at both Ibrox and Celtic Park, plus the signing of continental players gave supporters hope of a challenge for European qualification in seasons to come.

Team kit and sponsors
Xara remained Dundee's kit manufacturer, and introduced a new kit for the season. The kit featured predominantly navy shorts for the first time since 1995. The socks were identical to those of the previous season's kit, while the shirt featured a thick white stripe running from the collar down the inside of the sleeves to the cuffs.

Final league table

Results
Dundee's score comes first

Legend

Scottish Premier League

Scottish Cup

Scottish League Cup

First-team squad
Squad at end of season

Left club during season

Transfers

In

Out

References

Dundee F.C. seasons
Dundee